B.V.S.M.P. was an American hip hop group, formed in the 1980s. The band consisted of Percy Rodgers, Calvin Williams and Frederick Byrd.

B.V.S.M.P. (short for Baby Virgo Shocking Mister P) is best remembered for the hit single "I Need You", which became a worldwide hit in the summer of 1988. It spent 12 weeks on the UK Singles Chart, peaking at number 3 in July 1988. The background music and vocal was also sampled on the hit dance song, "The Electric Slide".

B.V.S.M.P. are also mentioned by name in the track, "Roller Disco" on Goldie Lookin Chain's Greatest Hits album.

Discography

Studio albums
The Best Belong Together (1988)
Shake That Thang (1993)

Singles

References

External links
B.V.S.M.P. on discogs

American hip hop musicians